Amasama is a small town and is the capital of Ga West Municipal District, an MMDA located within the Greater Accra Region of Ghana. The town is known for the Amasama Secondary Technical School.  The school is a second cycle institution.

References

Populated places in the Greater Accra Region